Ashley Aune is an American business owner and politician. She currently serves as a member of the Missouri House of Representatives, representing the 14th district in the Northland of Kansas City, Missouri.

Missouri House of Representatives

Committee assignments 
Aune serves on the following committees: Rules - Legislative Oversight, Special Committee on Small Business, Downsizing State Government, and Emerging Issues. She is the Ranking Minority Member on the Emerging Issues Committee.

Electoral history

References

21st-century American politicians
Living people
Democratic Party members of the Missouri House of Representatives
Women state legislators in Missouri
Year of birth missing (living people)
Place of birth missing (living people)
University of Missouri–Kansas City alumni
21st-century American women politicians